The Headland of Cape La Hune is a remote point of land on the south coast of the island of Newfoundland in the Canadian province of Newfoundland and Labrador. The Cape is the location of the provincial electoral district of Fortune Bay-Cape La Hune.

Not far from the Cape itself was the fishing community of Cape La Hune which was settled in the early 19th century by West Country English families.

See also
List of communities in Newfoundland and Labrador
List of ghost towns in Newfoundland and Labrador

References

Headlands of Newfoundland and Labrador
Ghost towns in Newfoundland and Labrador